Now Bahar or Naubahar or Nowbahar may refer to:
 Now Bahar, Isfahan
 Now Bahar, Kerman
 Now Bahar, Bijar, Kurdistan Province
 Now Bahar, Divandarreh, Kurdistan Province
 Nowbahar, Saqqez, Kurdistan Province
 Nowbahar, Markazi
 Now Bahar, Bajestan, Razavi Khorasan Province
 Now Bahar-e Gholaman, Razavi Khorasan Province
 Now Bahar-e Kordian, Razavi Khorasan Province
 Now Bahar, Chenaran, Razavi Khorasan Province
 Nowbahar, Nishapur, Razavi Khorasan Province
 Nowbahar, Zeberkhan, Nishapur County, Razavi Khorasan Province
 Now Bahar, Sabzevar, Razavi Khorasan Province
 Now Bahar, South Khorasan